Desmond Devlin is an American comedy writer. His work has appeared in Mad since 1984, and with more than 450 bylined articles, he ranks as one of the magazine's three most frequent non-illustrating writers.

He has also written over fifty TV and movie parodies for the magazine, including all eight of the Harry Potter films and all six installments of the Lord of the Rings/Hobbit film series.

He was nominated for a 2001 Harvey Award for Best Writer for his work at Mad. He was also nominated for a CableACE award in 1994 for the game show Rumor Has It.

In September 2020, with Mad having been reduced to a primarily reprint format, Devlin and Mad artist Tom Richmond announced that they were crowdfunding a book of newly-created movie parodies called Claptrap. They launched their Indiegogo campaign with the completed two-page opening spread for Star Worse: Plagiarizing Skywalker, a spoof of the ninth film in the Star Wars saga. The book will also include takeoffs of older popular or iconic films that Mad had for various reasons opted not to parody at the time of their releases. The other eleven films are The Big Lebowski, Blade Runner, The Blues Brothers, Citizen Kane, Die Hard, Goodfellas, The Princess Bride, Psycho, The Shawshank Redemption, Toy Story 4 and Unforgiven.

References

External links

 Complete list of Devlin's MAD articles
 

Mad (magazine) people
American comedy writers
American comics writers
American satirists
American parodists
Living people
Hunter College High School alumni
Year of birth missing (living people)